Novaledo is a comune (municipality) in Trentino in the northern Italian region Trentino-Alto Adige/Südtirol, located in the Bassa Valsugana valley (Lower part of the Valsugana valley) about  southeast of Trento.

Novaledo borders the following municipalities: Frassilongo, Roncegno, Borgo Valsugana, Pergine Valsugana and Levico Terme.

Demographic evolution

References

Cities and towns in Trentino-Alto Adige/Südtirol